The People's Unification Party (PUP), also known as the Native People's Party, is a political party in Liberia.

History
The PUP was established in 2014, with its founders including House of Representatives member James Emmanuel Nuquay and Senator Henry Yallah, and was joined by Senator Sumo Kupee after he was defeated in the Unity Party primaries. It won a single seat in the December 2014 Senate elections, with Jim Tornonlah elected in Margibi County.

References

Political parties in Liberia
Political parties established in 2014
2014 establishments in Liberia